Istiqlol ( formerly Qashot) is a village and jamoat in Tajikistan. It is located in Lakhsh District, one of the Districts of Republican Subordination. The jamoat has a total population of 3,890 (2015). It consists of 4 villages: Dumbrasozon, Sari Pul, Kontoy and Khingsoy.

References

Populated places in Districts of Republican Subordination
Jamoats of Tajikistan